Taryn Grant (born November 19, 1994) is a Canadian water skier. She participated at the 2022 World Games in the water skiing competition, being awarded the silver medal in the women's jump event.

References 

1994 births
Living people
Place of birth missing (living people)
Canadian water skiers
World Games silver medalists
Competitors at the 2022 World Games
21st-century Canadian women